Julio Canani (November 13, 1938 – February 5, 2021) was a Peruvian-born American horse trainer in Thoroughbred horse racing. He won three Breeders' Cup races.

Biography 
Canani emigrated to the United States in 1954, and settled in California where he began working for racehorse trainer Tommy Doyle. In 1968, he obtained his trainer's license and over the next few years earned a reputation for developing claiming horses into stakes race winners. In 1993, having won numerous major California races including the prestigious Santa Anita Handicap, Canani took a break from racing until the spring of 1997 when he returned to operate the Nick Canani Racing Stable at Hollywood Park Racetrack. He went on to win the 1999 and 2001 editions of the Breeders' Cup Mile and in 2004 the Breeders' Cup Juvenile Fillies.

Canani was afflicted with dementia in recent years. He died on February 5, 2021, at Huntington Hospital in Pasadena, California. He was 82, and contracted COVID-19 in the time leading up to his death.

References

 Julio Canani's bio and statistics at Santa Anita Park
 Julio Canani's bio and statistics at the NTRA
 March 24, 2008 Bloodhorse.com article titled Perennial Visitor Canani is Unofficial Ambassador for Dubai

1938 births
2021 deaths
American racehorse trainers
People from Pasco Region
Peruvian emigrants to the United States
Deaths from the COVID-19 pandemic in California